Mrs. Fazilet and Her Daughters is a Turkish drama television series.

Plot
The shows depicts a story a single mother, Fazilet and her two daughters, Hazan and Ece. Fazilet is eagar to improve her family's financial and social standing by pushing her younger daughter Ece into the world of fashion and modelling. 
Fazilet's older daughter Hazan works as a fitness trainer and has strained relationship with her mother as she is against her financial ambititions. However while working as a fitness trainer, Hazan falls in love with a spoiled rich man (Sinan) and their relationship changes both families lives forever.
Ece,a high schooler,though follows her mother dictates is in love with neighbour Yasin since young.Yasin is also her classmate and basketball player who loves Ece madly.

Cast and characters

Episodes

International broadcasting

| 
| بنات فضيلةbnet Fadhila
| Nessma TV

| 
| Fazilet asszony és lányai
| TV2

| 
| የፉዚሌት ልጆች
| Kana TV

| 
| Mrs. Fazilet & Her Daughters  
| ST Swahili TV

Awards and nominations

References

External links

ace gets hamil so she married hazem egemler ad her love dumped her

Turkish drama television series
Star TV (Turkey) original programming
2017 Turkish television series debuts